The following list includes notable people who were born or have lived in Brattleboro, Vermont.

Artists and entertainers 

 Sam Amidon, folk artist
 Tony Barrand, musician
 Saul Bellow, winner of the 1976 Nobel Prize in Literature
 H. H. Bennett, photographer
 Thomas Chubbuck, engraver and designer of the "Brattleboro stamp"
 Douglas Cox, violin maker
 Ely Culbertson, contract bridge player and promoter
 Doveman (real name Thomas Bartlett), musician
 Jacob Estey, reed organ maker
 Karen Hesse, children's author
 Leavitt Hunt, photography pioneer and attorney
 Richard Morris Hunt, architect
 William Morris Hunt, painter
 Wolf Kahn, painter
 Rudyard Kipling, British author, wrote The Jungle Book, Captains Courageous, "Mandalay" and Gunga Din while residing there; later received the Nobel Prize in Literature
 Joanna Noëlle Levesque, singer and actor
 Ki Longfellow, novelist, playwright and screenwriter
 Leslie William Miller, artistic subject
 Blanche Honegger Moyse, choral conductor
 Marcel Moyse, flute player
 Bing Russell, actor, baseball player and executive, father of Kurt Russell
 Patrick Schneeweis, folk-punk artist
 King Tuff, musician
 Royall Tyler, playwright
 Kit Watkins, musician
 Claude Williamson, musician
 Stu Williamson, musician

Bands 

 Johnny Hobo and the Freight Trains

Military 

 Theodore P. Greene, U.S. Navy rear admiral
 George Bradley Kellogg, Adjutant General of the Vermont National Guard, Lieutenant Colonel of the 1st Vermont Cavalry Regiment in the American Civil War
 John W. Phelps, brigadier general in the Union Army during the American Civil War, and later a minor party candidate for president

Politics  

 Becca Balint, U.S. Congresswoman, President pro tempore of the Vermont Senate
 F. Elliott Barber, Jr., Vermont Attorney General
 Herbert G. Barber, Vermont Attorney General
 John S. Burgess, lieutenant governor of Vermont
 Arthur P. Carpenter, US Marshal for Vermont
 Willard H. Chandler, Wisconsin state senator
 Harrie B. Chase, Judge of the United States Court of Appeals for the Second Circuit, brother of Paul A. Chase
 Paul A. Chase, Associate Justice of the Vermont Supreme Court, brother of Harrie B. Chase
 Ezra Clark, Jr., U.S. congressman
 James Elliot, U.S. congressman
 Clarke C. Fitts, Vermont Attorney General
 Levi K. Fuller, 44th Governor of Vermont
 Ernest Willard Gibson, U.S. Senator
 Ernest W. Gibson Jr., Governor of Vermont
 Ernest W. Gibson III, Associate Justice of the Vermont Supreme Court
 Abram A. Hammond, 12th Governor of Indiana
 Broughton Harris, Vermont newspaper editor and businessman; one of the Runaway Officials of 1851 as Secretary of the Utah Territory
 Christian Hansen Jr., U.S. Marshal for Vermont and member of the Vermont House of Representatives
 Kittredge Haskins, U.S. congressman
 Frederick Holbrook, 27th Governor of Vermont
 Frank E. Howe, lieutenant governor of Vermont
 George Howe, State's Attorney of Windham County, United States Attorney for the District of Vermont, member of the Vermont Senate
 Jonathan Hunt, bank president and congressman
 Daniel Kellogg, U.S. Attorney for the District of Vermont and Justice of the Vermont Supreme Court
 Samuel Knight, chief justice of the Vermont Supreme Court
James Loren Martin, Judge of the United States District Court for the District of Vermont
 John Humphrey Noyes, utopian socialist, free love advocate, and founder of the Oneida Community
 Samuel E. Perkins, Justice of the Indiana Supreme Court
 Harvey Putnam, U.S. congressman
 Peter Shumlin, 81st Governor of Vermont
 Micah Townshend, Secretary of State of Vermont
 Sharon Treat, member of the Maine House of Representatives and Maine Senate
 James Manning Tyler, U.S. congressman
 Eleazer L. Waterman, Judge of the Vermont Superior Court
 Miro Weinberger, mayor of Burlington, Vermont
 Hoyt Henry Wheeler, Judge of the United States District Court for the District of Vermont

Philanthropist 

 Ronald Read, philanthropist, investor, janitor, and gas station attendant who received media coverage after his death in 2014 due to bequeathing US$1.2 million to Brooks Memorial Library and $4.8 million to Brattleboro Memorial Hospital.

Professionals 

Emma Bailey, first American woman auctioneer
Walter J. Bigelow, editor at the Brattleboro Reformer, former mayor of Burlington, Vermont
Dr. Charles Chapin, U.S. Marshal for Vermont
 Alonzo Church, college president
 William Bullock Clark, geologist
Donald J. Cram, Nobel Laureate in Chemistry, grew up in Brattleboro
 James Fisk, financier
 Charles Christopher Frost, botanist
 Edwin Brant Frost, astronomer
 Ida May Fuller, first recipient of Social Security check
 John Holbrook, publisher and businessman
 Richard Morris Hunt, architect
Leif K-Brooks, computer programmer and web designer
 William Rutherford Mead, architect
 James L. Oakes, judge
 Herbert Reiner Jr., diplomat
 Samuel Stearns, astronomer and doctor
 William Willard, school founder
 Jody Williams, teacher, aid worker, anti-land mines activist, and Nobel laureate

Sports 

 Brad Baker, minor league baseball player
 Chris Duffy, center fielder and first baseman for the Pittsburgh Pirates, Milwaukee Brewers, and Philadelphia Phillies
 James Galanes, Olympic cross-country skier
 Ernie Johnson, pitcher for the Boston Braves/Milwaukee Braves and Baltimore Orioles
 Bill Koch, cross-country skier, Olympic silver medalist, World championship bronze medalist, World cup winner
 Joe Shield, quarterback for the Green Bay Packers
 George Schildmiller, college baseball, basketball, and football player and college football coach

References 

Brattleboro, Vermont
Brattleboro